Oteruelo de la Valduerna is a locality and minor local entity located in the municipality of Santiago Millas, in León province, Castile and León, Spain. As of 2020, it has a population of 25.

Geography 
Oteruelo de la Valduerna is located 55km west-southwest of León, Spain.

References

Populated places in the Province of León